Babak Karimi (born 1960) is a Czech-Iranian actor. For his role in A Separation, he won the Silver Bear for Best Actor at the 61st Berlin International Film Festival in 2011.

Filmography

Film 

 Tickets (2005)

 A Separation (2011)
 The Past (2013)
 Fish & Cat (2013)
 360 Degree (2014)
 The Girl's House (2014)
 The Salesman (2016)
 A Wedding (2016)
 Death of the Fish (2016)
 Invasion (2017)
 The Last Prosecco (2017)
 The Role (2018) (short)
 Yalda, a Night for Forgiveness (2019)
 The Life Ahead (2020)
No Choice (2020)
Shahre Gheseh Cinema (2020)
Careless Crime (2020)
At the End of Evin (2021)
Majority (2021)
Zeros and Ones (2021)
Until Tomorrow (2022)
The Loser Man (2022)
Visiting Time (2022) (short)

Bucharest (2022)
The Wastetown (2022)
Odyssey of Solitude (TBA)

Web

Television

References

External links 

berlinale Babak Karimi

1960 births
Living people
People from Prague
Iranian cinematographers
Iranian male film actors
Iranian film directors
Iranian film editors
Silver Bear for Best Actor winners
20th-century Iranian male actors
21st-century Iranian male actors